Tricholathys is a genus of cribellate araneomorph spiders in the family Dictynidae, and was first described by R. V. Chamberlin & Wilton Ivie in 1935.

Species
 it contains twelve species:
Tricholathys cascadea Chamberlin & Gertsch, 1958 – USA
Tricholathys hansi (Schenkel, 1950) – USA
Tricholathys hirsutipes (Banks, 1921) – USA
Tricholathys jacinto Chamberlin & Gertsch, 1958 – USA
Tricholathys knulli Gertsch & Mulaik, 1936 – USA
Tricholathys monterea Chamberlin & Gertsch, 1958 – USA
Tricholathys ovtchinnikovi Marusik, Omelko & Ponomarev, 2017 – Russia (Caucasus)
Tricholathys relicta Ovtchinnikov, 2001 – Kyrgyzstan
Tricholathys rothi Chamberlin & Gertsch, 1958 – Canada, USA
Tricholathys saltona Chamberlin, 1948 – USA
Tricholathys spiralis Chamberlin & Ivie, 1935 (type) – Canada, USA
Tricholathys subnivalis (Ovtchinnikov, 1989) – Kyrgyzstan, Tajikistan

References

External links
Tricholathys at BugGuide

Araneomorphae genera
Dictynidae
Spiders of Asia
Spiders of North America